Conus zandbergeni is a species of sea snail, a marine gastropod mollusc in the family Conidae, the cone snails and their allies.

Like all species within the genus Conus, these snails are predatory and venomous. They are capable of "stinging" humans, therefore live ones should be handled carefully or not at all.

Description
The size of the shell varies between 25 mm and 42 mm.

Distribution
This marine species occurs in the Indo-Pacific and is found in the Philippines, Indonesia, and the Solomon Islands.

References

 Filmer R.M. (2011) Taxonomic review of the Conus spectrum, Conus stramineus and Conus collisus complexes (Gastropoda - Conidae) - Part I. Visaya 3(2): 23–85. [July 2011]

External links
 The Conus Biodiversity website
 
 Cone Shells – Knights of the Sea

zandbergeni
Gastropods described in 2010